The 1981 East Texas State Lions football team represented East Texas State University—now known as Texas A&M University–Commerce—as a member of the Lone Star Conference (LSC) during the 1981 NCAA Division II football season. Led by 18th-year head coach Ernest Hawkins, the Lions compiled an overall record of 7–4 with a mark of 4–3 in conference play, placing fifth in the LSC. East Texas State played home games at Memorial Stadium in Commerce, Texas.

Schedule

Postseason awards

All-Americans
Cary Noiel, First Team Running Back

All-Lone Star Conference

LSC First Team
Cary Noiel, Running Back

LSC Second Team
Anthony Brock, Linebacker
Frank Moore, Tight End
Peter Roos, Offensive Tackle
Ted Sample, Fullback
Darren Smith, Defensive Back
Randy Smith, Tight End

LSC Honorable Mention
Blake Cooper, Center
Randy Jones, Punter
Kyle Mackey, Quarterback

References

East Texas State
Texas A&M–Commerce Lions football seasons
East Texas State football